Shodhan Rai is an internationally acclaimed natural body builder. He was awarded the Ekalavya Award for sports in 2014 by the Government of Karnataka.

He has represented India in various International Bodybuilding Competitions.

Awards 

Ekalavya Award for sports in 2014 by Government of Karnataka
Winner of "Ekalavya Award 2013", highest honours by the Karnataka Govt. for a sportsperson.

 GOLD at the Natural World Cup 2022, Los Angeles, U.S.A.
 7th at the Natural Olympia 2022, Las Vegas, U.S.A.
 BRONZE at the Natural Olympia 2019, Las Vegas, U.S.A.
 SILVER at the Natural Universe 2019, Los Angeles, U.S.A.
 2xGOLD, 1xSILVER, BEST POSER at the Natural World Cup 2019, Sydney, Australia.
 BRONZE at the Natural Olympia 2018, Las Vegas, U.S.A.
 SILVER at the Natural Universe 2018, Brisbane, Australia.
 BRONZE at the Natural Olympia 2017, Las Vegas, U.S.A.
 GOLD at the Natural World Cup 2017, Los Angeles, U.S.A.
 GOLD at the Natural Universe 2017, Auckland, New Zealand.
 SILVER at the Natural Olympia 2016, Las Vegas, U.S.A.
 7th at the Natural World 2016, Budapest, Hungary.
 8th at the Natural Olympia 2015, Las Vegas, U.S.A. 
 8th at the Natural World 2015, Dubai, U.A.E.
 6th at the Natural Olympia 2014, San Diego, U.S.A.
 8th at the Natural Olympia 2013, San Diego, U.S.A.
 6th at the Musclemania 2013, Las Vegas, U.S.A.
 5th at the Natural Olympia 2012, Reno, U.S.A.
 Represented India at the Musclemania 2012, Las Vegas, U.S.A.
 SILVER at the Asia Pacific 2012, Auckland, New Zealand.
 8th at the Mr.Universe 2011, Hamburg, Germany.
 6th at the Asia Pacific 2011, Boracay Island, Philippines.
 SILVER at the Asia Pacific 2010, Rarotonga, Cook Islands, New Zealand.
 SILVER at the Asia Pacific 2009, Christchurch, New Zealand.
 8th at the Mr.World 2008, Athens, Greece. 
 7th at the Indo-Pak 2004, Islamabad, Pakistan.
 BRONZE at the Mr. Universe 2001 (U-21), Charney les Macon, France.
 Winner of Mr.India, Mr.Karnataka in the category/class.
 Winner of Mr.Bangalore 2001.
 Winner of Mr. Bangalore University, 2001 and 2002.

References

External links
http://www.daijiworld.com/news/news_disp.asp?n_id=199210 

Tulu people
Sportspeople from Bangalore
Bodybuilding
Year of birth missing (living people)
Living people